Tuckermannopsis is a genus of foliose lichens in the family Parmeliaceae.

Taxonomy
The genus was circumscribed in 1933 by Hungarian lichenologist Vilmos Kőfaragó-Gyelnik. The genus name of Tuckermannopsis was in honour of Edward Tuckerman (1817–1886), who was an American botanist and professor who made significant contributions to the study of lichens and other alpine plants. He was a founding member of the Natural History Society of Boston and most of his career was spent at Amherst College. 

Tuckermanopsis ciliaris was assigned as the type, and at that time, only species. The type species is a cetrarioid lichen, meaning it is erect, foliose, and with apothecia and pycnidia (sexual and asexual reproductive structures, respectively) that are largely restricted to the margins of the lobes. Starting in the 1980s, the genus became a wastebasket taxon containing cetrarioid species of uncertain taxonomic affinities. In 2001, Ingvar Kärnefelt and Arne Thell attempted to delimit Tuckermannopsis based on a combination of morphology and molecular phylogeny, although the DNA of only four species was used in the analysis. They accepted seven species in the genus, with distribution centres in western North America and Japan.

In 2017, Divakar and colleagues used a recently developed "temporal phylogenetic" approach to identify temporal bands for specific taxonomic ranks in the family Parmeliaceae, suggesting that groups of species that diverged within the time window of 29.45–32.55 million years ago represent genera. They proposed to synonymize Tuckermannopsis (and several other cetrelioid genera) with Nephromopsis, so that all the genera within the Parmeliaceae are about the same age. Although some of their proposed taxonomic changes were accepted, the synonymization of the cetrelioid genera with Nephromopsis was not accepted in a later critical analysis of the temporal phylogenetic technique for use in fungal systematics.

Description
Characteristic of genus Tuckermannopsis include a thallus that is either foliose (leafy) or somewhat fruticose (shrubby) with an upper surface that is brown or greenish in colour; cyclindircal asci with a small tholus (a thickened apical region) and broad axial body; ascospores that are more or less spherical, measuring 4–8 μm in diameter; the absence of the secondary metabolite usnic acid in the cortex, and the presence of various compounds in the medulla.

Species

Tuckermannopsis americana 
Tuckermannopsis aurescens 
Tuckermannopsis chlorophylla 
Tuckermannopsis ciliaris 
Tuckermannopsis gilva 
Tuckermannopsis hengduanensis 
Tuckermannopsis merrillii 
Tuckermannopsis microphyllica 
Tuckermannopsis orbata 
Tuckermannopsis subalpina 
Tuckermannopsis ulophylloides 
Tuckermannopsis weii 

The lichen once called Tuckermannopsis inermis  has been transferred to genus Melanohalea, as Masonhalea inermis. T. coralligera  and T. fendleri  have been moved to genus Tuckermanella, created in 2003 to contain cetrarioid lichens previously placed in the "Cetraria fendleri" species group.

References

Parmeliaceae
Lichen genera
Lecanorales genera
Taxa described in 1933
Taxa named by Vilmos Kőfaragó-Gyelnik